The following are the telephone codes in Mali.

Calling formats
To call Mali, the following format is used: +223 XXXX XXXX.

Calls within Mali use 8 digits and there are no area codes.

List of allocations in Mali
In the notation below, 'M', 'C', 'D', and 'U' stand for thousands, hundreds, tens, and units, respectively.

The new number plan took effect in 2008.

General rules

See also 
 Telecommunications in Mali

References

Mali
Telecommunications in Mali
Telephone numbers